Tower of Terror is a 1941 British wartime thriller film directed by Lawrence Huntington and starring Wilfrid Lawson, Michael Rennie and Movita. It was made at Welwyn Studios with location shooting on Flat Holm off the Welsh coast.

The film makes no attempt at either German or even German accents and all German characters speak with an educated English accent.

Plot
Anthony Hale is a British secret agent in Germany who takes a job as assistant to lighthouse keeper Wolfe Kristan under the assumed name of Albers. He plans to return to Britain with some valuable papers. The plan is for him to be picked up by a British boat. He meets and befriends Marie, who has escaped from a concentration camp and pretends to be the keeper's niece. She had tried to evade capture by the local police by jumping into the sea but was rescued and taken to the lighthouse by the deranged Kristan, who sees in her the image of Marthe, his wife whom he killed 16 years earlier and buried in the basement of the lighthouse. 
Kristan has a hook instead of a right hand giving him a sinister appearance. This disability increases his need for an assistant.

Kritan tries to kill Albers by hoisting him up the side of the lighthouse on the pretence of a high-level task but then releases the winch, hoping Albers will fall to his death. This does not work.

After several violent encounters with Kristan, Hale and Marie manage to make their way down to the beach where they board the British boat. The lighthouse is destroyed by gunfire from a German destroyer whose captain had been alerted by Hale's signal to his rescue vessel. Kristan, prostrate with grief over his wife's opened grave, is killed during the bombardment.

Cast
 Wilfrid Lawson as Wolfe Kristan  
 Michael Rennie as Anthony Hale/ Eric Albers  
 Movita as Marie Durand  
 Morland Graham as Harbour Master Kleber  
 George Woodbridge as Gruppenfuhrer Rudolf Jurgens 
 Charles Rolfe as Albers  
 Richard George as Ship's Captain Borkmann  
 H Victor Weske as Peters, resigning lighthouse assistant 
 Olive Sloane as Florist 
 Eric Clavering as Riemers 
 John Longden as Commander  
 Edward Sinclair as Fletcher, Hale's contact 
 Bob Cameron as Military Sergeant 
 Davina Craig 
 Noel Dainton

Critical reception
The New York Times reviewer called it a "dire little melodrama...A penny dreadful thriller about a mad lighthouse keeper on the German-occupied coast, it cannot overcome the lack of a preposterous story preposterously acted, or a sound track which gives the impression that every one is speaking with a gag over the mouth. Even Wilfrid Lawson, that excellent actor, gives a ludicrously overwrought portrait of insanity as the keeper...Not good". In Beacons in the Dark, film historian Robyn Ludwig critiques the film for its "deranged lighthouse keeper... a threatening presence, with bulging eyes, unkempt moustache and mutilated arm with a sharp metal prosthetic in place of a right hand."

References

Bibliography
 Chibnall, Steve & McFarlane, Brian. The British 'B' Film. Palgrave MacMillan, 2009.

External links
 

1941 films
1940s spy thriller films
British spy thriller films
Films set in Germany
Films shot at Welwyn Studios
Films shot in Wales
Films directed by Lawrence Huntington
British black-and-white films
1940s English-language films
1940s British films